Isaac Lampronti (February 3, 1679 – November 16, 1756) was an Italian rabbi and physician, best known as author of the rabbinic encyclopedia Paħad Yitzħak.

Lampronti was born at Ferrara.  His great-grandfather, Samuel Lampronti, had emigrated from Constantinople to Ferrara in the sixteenth century. His father, a man of wealth, died when Isaac was six years of age. Isaac was sent to school in his eighth year, his teachers being Shabbethai Elhanan Recanati and S. E. Sanguineti. In his fourteenth year he went to Lugo, to the school of R. Manoah Provençal; thence he went to Padua to study medicine, attending at the same time lectures on philosophy. There he enjoyed especially the intercourse and instruction of the physician R. Isaac Cantarini.

On completing his medical studies he was employed as teacher for a time in various Italian cities, and on his return to his native city the yeshibah conferred upon him the title of ḥaber. Shortly afterward he went to Mantua to complete his rabbinical studies under R. Judah Brial and R. Joseph Cases, who also was a physician. Lampronti entered into especially close relations with R. Judah, whom he frequently mentions in his great work. When Mantua was threatened with war, in 1701, Lampronti, following the wishes of his family, returned to Ferrara, where he established himself as physician and teacher, delivering lectures for adults in his house both on week-days and on the Sabbath.

Teacher

In 1709 Lampronti was appointed teacher at the Italian Talmud Torah, receiving a monthly salary of twelve scudi in return for devoting the larger part of his day to teaching chiefly Hebrew grammar, arithmetic, and Italian. Lampronti gave his pupils his own homilies on the weekly sections, composed in Italian, for practise in translating into Hebrew. He also set some of his pupils to copy from the sources material which he needed for the encyclopedic work he had undertaken.

The directors of the community, who thought this interfered with his duties as teacher, forbade him, in October, 1725, to keep the material for his work in the schoolhouse. When the Spanish Talmud Torah was discontinued, in 1729, the pupils of this school also passed into the hands of Lampronti. Thus he became the teacher of most of the members of the community, and long after his death it was said in the community of Ferrara, "All the learning found among us is derived from the mouth of our father Isaac."

In addition to his duties as teacher he filled the position of preacher, from 1704, in the Sephardic community, and, beginning with 1717, in the Italian synagogue. His sermons, which were very popular, have not been preserved. He mentions one of them, on truth and untruth, in referring to his "Sefer ha-Derushim Shelli" in an article of his "Paḥad Yiẓḥaḳ" (letter מ, article ). His funeral oration ("Darke Shalom") on Samson Morpurgo he mentions in his approbation to the latter's responsa "Shemesh Ẓedaḳah." His name is connected with an Ark of the Law in the Sephardic synagogue at Ferrara, placed there by him in 1710, at his own cost.

In 1718 Lampronti was appointed a full member of the rabbinical college. His signature as the latest member, following those of Mordecai Zahalon, Shabbethai Elhanan Recanati, and Samuel Baruch Borghi, is found in a responsum of the yeshibah of Ferrara of the year 1727, which he quotes (letter ב, p. 20d).

Physician

In 1738 he was elected rabbi of the Spanish synagogue in place of his former teacher, Recanati; and after the death of Mordecai Zahalon he became president of the yeshibah (1749). He began immediately the printing of his great work (see below). He had then reached the age of seventy, and for the next eight years until his death, he taught continuously, although he had to be taken to the school by his pupils on account of an ailment of his feet.

Notwithstanding his other occupations, he continued to practise medicine, visiting his patients early in the morning, because, as he said, the physician has a surer eye and can judge better of the state of his patient after the night's rest. He had a great reputation as physician, and his contemporaries generally added to his name the epithet "the famous physician."

He corresponded on medical subjects with his teacher Isaac Cantarini, and he drew upon his medical knowledge in many passages of his work.

He died deeply mourned by the community and his numerous pupils. No stone was erected on his grave, for half a year before his death the tombstones of the Jewish cemetery of Ferrara had been destroyed at the instigation of the clergy (Ferrara belonged to the Papal States), and the Jews were at the same time forbidden to place stones on the graves of their dead. More than a century later, Ferrara publicly honored the memory of Lampronti; on April 19, 1872, a stone tablet, for which Jews and Christians had contributed, was placed on the house in which he had lived; it bears the following inscription: "Abitò in questa casa Isacco Lampronti, nato nel MDCLXXIX., morto nel MDCCLVI. Medico Teologo tra i dotti celebratissimo. Onorò la patria. Riverenti alla scienza alcuni cittadini posero MDCCCLXXII."

The "Pachad Yitzchak"

Lampronti's life-work was his rabbinical encyclopedia Pachad Yitzchak (name derived from Gen. xxxi. 42), the material for which he had begun to collect as early as his student days at Mantua, and on which he worked during his whole life. When he decided in his old age to publish this great work, he traveled together with his pupil Jacob Raphael Saraval, as the latter says in the preface of the correctors (Saraval and Simchah Calimani), through the Italian cities in order to secure the approbations (haskamot) of the rabbinical authorities of Italy for the work.

The collection of these approbations, which were given in 1749 and 1750, is a curious monument of the Jewish scholars of northern Italy in the eighteenth century; it includes sonnets and poems in other forms in honor of Lampronti. The following cities are represented by their yeshibahs or rabbis: Venice, Leghorn, Reggio, Verona, Ancona, Padua, Mantua, Casale Monferrato, Modena, Turin, Florence, Alessandria della Paglia, Pesaro, Finale, Lugo, Rovigo. In the second volume are added the approbations of R. Malachi ben Jacob Kohn of Livorno, author of the "Yad Mal'achi," and of three Palestinian scholars stopping at Ferrara.

The work was planned to fill six volumes, as recorded in the printing permit of the Jewish communal directorate of Venice. But only the first volume and the first half of the second volume appeared during the author's lifetime. Vol. i. (1750) contains in two specially paged sections (of 124 and 76 folios respectively) the letter א; the first part of vol. ii. (1753) contains the letters ב (fol. 1-75) and ו (fol. 76-105). The second part of vol. ii. appeared forty years after the author's death (1796); it contains the letters ח (fol. 1-49), ו (fol. 50-60), ן (fol. 67-77), ח, beginning (78-110). Vol. iii. appeared in the same year; it contains: ח, end (fol. 1-61), ט (fol. 63-93). These volumes were printed at the press of Isaac Foa (formerly Bragadini) at Venice. Two other volumes appeared in 1813 (vol. iv., Reggio) and 1840 (vol. v., Leghorn); vol. iv. contains the letters י (fol. 1-41a.), ב (fol. 41a-108); ל (specially paged, 1-26); vol. v. contains the letter מ (241 fols.). This last-named volume contains additions to the text by Abraham Baruch Piperno, under the title "Zechor le-Abraham."

In 1845 the autograph manuscript of the entire work was acquired by the Bibliothèque Nationale of Paris, in 120 volumes, 68 of which corresponded with the parts that had so far appeared. The Paris manuscript also contains the author's Italian correspondence, which was not included in the edition (see Cat. Hebr. MSS. Bibliothèque Nationale. p. 61. Nos. 458-577). The society Mekitze Nirdamim, on its foundation, took as one of its first tasks the publication of those portions of Lampronti's work which had not yet been printed. The first to appear (in octavo instead of folio, the size of the previous volumes) were the letters נ (1864; 100 fols.), ס (1866; 196 fols.), ע (1868; 173 fols.), פ (1871; 74 fols.), and צ and first half of ק (1874; 200 fols.). The work was continued ten years later by the reorganized society Mekitze Nirdamim; during 1885-87 the remainder of the letter ק was published and the letters ר (148 fols.), ש (318 fols.), and ח (183 fols.). Thus the publication of the work was completed 127 years after the printing of the first volume.

Character of the work

Lampronti's work is an alphabetically arranged encyclopedia to the Talmud and Talmudic literature. In the censor's permit, dated June, 1749, prefixed to the first volume, it is designated as "Dizionario Rituale in Lingua Ebraica," a designation which probably originated with the author. As a matter of fact Lampronti's encyclopedia deals chiefly with the Halachah, the material for the articles being taken from the entire halachic literature down to the latest responsa, which he had, in part, in manuscript. He devotes much space to discussing questions of ritual law, as found in the responsa of contemporary Italian rabbis. On some questions he gives the entire correspondence, as on fols. 9d-13a, 31d-37d, 46d-50a, 74b-76a, 79c-80b, 102b-107a, in the first volume.

The arrangement is a characteristic feature of the work. Single words are used occasionally as headings for his articles, but more frequently he uses entire sentences, either as he found them in the sources, or as propositions derived from the sources. In vol. i. thirty articles begin with the word<?> ; and a special article, besides, refers to about one hundred other articles of the work in which this concept is treated (see Jew. Encyc. ii. 215-218). About one hundred articles begin with the word<?>, and a special article refers to as many more in which the word occurs. The articles are arranged in strictly alphabetical order, this being especially important in a work of this kind. The quotations are accompanied by an exact statement of their sources. In addition to the Halakah much space is devoted to the Haggadah of the Talmuds, and the work may also be regarded as an alphabetical index of the Talmudic haggadic sentences.

It may be noted as a curious instance that in the article (ii. 766) Lampronti refers to a work in Italian, the title of which he quotes in carefully punctuated Hebrew transcription: "Demostrazioni della Essenza di Dio dalle Opere della sua Creazione; da Guglielmo Deram [], Firenze, 1719." Lampronti's work has not yet been critically examined, nor has a list been made of the sources which he used or quoted. Addenda made by Lampronti are preserved in the library of the Talmud Torah at Ferrara; according to Rabbi Benedetto Isaac Levi of Ferrara, the author of a short biography of Lampronti ("Ha-Maggid," xix. 70), there are thirty-five folios, most of the leaves of which are, however, blank. But the addenda which are scattered through the several volumes of the work itself would if collected make a stout volume.

Lampronti's elder son, Samuel Ḥay, is mentioned in the article ; his younger son, Solomon Lampronti, was a physician, like his father, and versed in rabbinical lore.

References
B. J. Levi, Della Vita e dell' Opera di Isacco Lampronti, Padua, 1871;
idem, in Ha-Maggid (1875), xix. 69 et seq.;
Nepi-Ghirondi, Toledot Gedole Yisrael;
Geiger, Jüd. Zeit. 1871, ix. 183 et seq.

1679 births
1756 deaths
18th-century Italian rabbis
Sephardi rabbis
Jewish encyclopedists
Italian encyclopedists
18th-century Italian physicians
18th-century Jewish physicians
Physicians from Ferrara
Religious leaders from Ferrara
Italian Sephardi Jews